EduGeek.net is a British-based online peer support community and information portal for IT professionals predominantly working in the field of education, operating primarily as an internet forum. Founded by Chris Byers and Ric Charlton in 2005, the site now has 2 full-time paid employees the founder, Chris Byers & the webmaster Shaun Garriock. As of June 2014 the sites member base exceeds 68,300 users.

History
EduGeek was founded in 2005 by Chris Byers, an IT Systems manager for Lancashire schools in the United Kingdom, who has since become employed with the site full-time. During research, he found there was no other website or community that specifically targeted IT professionals that worked in Education. The website initially used Dragonfly CMS, although this was found to be too restrictive and the site has since moved onto vBulletin. Today, the EduGeek community boasts a member base in excess of 31,000.

In April 2010, the NAHT released a report looking at the spending behaviours of schools and the way suppliers were taking advantage of them. This report was in part based on posts at Edugeek, where some members had provided detailed accounts of how their schools had been ripped off by some suppliers.

Following the announcement by the UK Government that it was to close Becta, members of EduGeek worked to ensure that the expertise and knowledge available from Becta didn't disappear, transferring it to various new homes on the internet.

EduGeek has been a regular feature at the BETT show, manning the technical support help point for visitors, staffed by volunteers from its membership.

Operation
The website currently has 3 Administrators and 16 Moderators, who volunteer personal time to contribute to the community. To help financially, the site has many sponsors such as Smoothwall and Promethean. The site also uses advertisements provided by AdSense to generate income.

Membership
All of EduGeek services to its members are provided free of charge. Member's details are never sold or passed on to third parties, and it's this integrity which remains one of the sites main strong points.
Its members come from all areas of the IT profession. Originally aimed at the burgeoning field of IT professionals working within the British education sector in the mid-2000s (decade), its membership now consists of IT staff from all over the world in education, health, banking and private sector.
While the forum remains focussed on the education sector, their Technical forums contain help and information covering all IT sectors. Its membership increases at a rate of just over 10,000 per year although this currently shows signs of increasing.

Public face
EduGeek spends a great deal of time and money ensuring the ‘community’ aspect of the site is developed by attending educational IT shows in the United Kingdom and the United States, as well as hosting its own annual conference, to ensure the staff and moderators get to meet its members in real life as much as possible.
Since its first conference in 2005, EduGeek has always ensured no costs will be passed onto its members for attending (apart from travel and accommodation costs) or catering during the event. EduGeek is a regular at the UK based BETT (British Educational Training and Technology) Show held each January at the London Olympia Exhibition Hall where it runs the shows Technical Help Point on behalf of show organisers EMAP, and has exhibited at the US International Society for Technology in Education show in Denver 2010 helping to increase awareness of the community in the US.

In February 2011, Microsoft invited 50 members of EduGeek over to their Reading Campus to discuss the different topics relating to Microsoft software in an educational environment and members got to voice their own concerns and questions such as licensing difficulties that small primary schools have compared to secondaries.

In the media
 In May 2007, Sophos threatened EduGeek with legal action due to criticizing posts of one of its members. Shortly after, Sophos apologised for their actions, blaming it on a staff member convincing their legal team to send the threats, rather than a senior management decision.
 In July 2008, the site was put offline due to a hardware issue at their hosting provider, Fasthosts. This downtime lasted several days and lead to angry members emailing the company en-masse to express their displeasure.

References

External links
 

Internet forums
Information technology education
Internet properties established in 2005
Education companies established in 2005
2005 establishments in England
Companies based in Preston